The Hardness Of The World is the second album by the American funk band Slave, released in 1977, their second album release that year. The lead single "The Party Song" reached number 22 on the Billboard Hot Soul Singles chart.

Track listing 
Life Can Be Happy   	 4:16   	
The Great American Funk Song 	3:50 	
Can't Get Enough Of You 	4:07 	
Baby Sinister 	6:45 	
The World's On Hard 	3:26 	
The Party Song 	4:07 	
We Can Make Love 	5:28 	
Volcano Rupture 	6:23

Charts

Singles

References

External links
 Slave - The Hardness Of The World at Discogs

1977 albums
Slave (band) albums
Cotillion Records albums